DXPM (91.9 FM), broadcasting as 91.9 Supreme FM, is a radio station owned and operated by Iddes Broadcast Group. The station's studio is located in Derequito Bldg., Dimsum Diner Compound, Rizal Ave., Digos.

References

Radio stations established in 2012
Radio stations in Davao del Sur
News and talk radio stations in the Philippines